William H. "Pat" Whitaker (December 6, 1865 in St. Louis, Missouri – July 15, 1902 in St. Louis, Missouri) was a Major League Baseball pitcher who played for the Baltimore Orioles from 1888 to 1889.

Whitaker made his Major League debut on October 11, 1888 at the age of 22. In the minors in 1888, he had a 7–3 win-loss record to go with a 0.83 earned run average in 11 games started. Though he allowed 36 runs, only eight were earned. He appeared in two games for the Orioles that season, going 1–1 with a 5.14 ERA and striking out five batters in 14 innings. The following year, he appeared in one game, allowing two earned runs and earning the win. He completed all three games in which he appeared in his career, posting a 2–1 record with a 3.91 ERA. He walked 10 batters and struck out six.

He appeared in his final big league game on July 25, 1889. Following his death in 1902, he was interred at St. Matthew Cemetery in St. Louis.

References

External links

1865 births
1902 deaths
Baltimore Orioles players
Baseball players from Missouri
19th-century baseball players
Dallas Hams players
Davenport Hawkeyes players
Waco Babies players
Portland (minor league baseball) players
Bradford (minor league baseball) players